Isel López Rodríguez (born July 11, 1970 in Santiago de Cuba) is a retired javelin thrower from Cuba. Her personal best throw is 61.66 metres, which she achieved in May 1999 in Havana.

Achievements

References

1970 births
Living people
Sportspeople from Santiago de Cuba
Cuban female javelin throwers
Athletes (track and field) at the 1995 Pan American Games
Athletes (track and field) at the 1992 Summer Olympics
Athletes (track and field) at the 1996 Summer Olympics
Olympic athletes of Cuba
World Athletics Championships athletes for Cuba
Universiade medalists in athletics (track and field)
Goodwill Games medalists in athletics
Central American and Caribbean Games gold medalists for Cuba
Competitors at the 1993 Central American and Caribbean Games
Universiade gold medalists for Cuba
Universiade silver medalists for Cuba
Central American and Caribbean Games medalists in athletics
Medalists at the 1991 Summer Universiade
Medalists at the 1997 Summer Universiade
Competitors at the 1998 Goodwill Games
Pan American Games competitors for Cuba
20th-century Cuban women
21st-century Cuban women